Roger Llewelyn Davies (born 13 January 1954) is a British astronomer and cosmologist, one of the so-called Seven Samurai collaboration who discovered an apparent concentration of mass in the Universe called the Great Attractor. He is the Philip Wetton Professor of Astrophysics at Oxford University. His research interests centre on cosmology and how galaxies form and evolve. He has a longstanding interest in astronomical instruments and telescopes and developed the scientific case for the UK's involvement in the 8m Gemini telescopes project. He has pioneered the use of a new class of astronomical spectrograph to measure the masses and ages of galaxies, as well as search for black holes in their nuclei. He is the founding Director of the Oxford Centre for Astrophysical Surveys which is funded by the Hintze Family Charitable Foundation.

Early life and education
Davies was born in Scunthorpe, Lincolnshire, and grew up there, attending John Leggott Grammar School. A school project fired his interest in astronomy, augmented by his parents’ purchase of a small telescope. As a teenager Davies also attended evening classes run by the Workers' Educational Association, becoming a lifelong supporter of astronomy outreach work.

Career and research
Davies took his first degree in Physics at University College London and his PhD at the Institute of Astronomy and Churchill College, Cambridge. Posts at Lick Observatory, California, then Cambridge and Kitt Peak National Observatory, Arizona, followed. While at Kitt Peak he became part of the Seven Samurai collaboration which surveyed the distances and velocities of 400 nearby elliptical galaxies, discovering the Great Attractor, at that time thought to be pulling the Milky Way and other galaxies in the direction of the constellations of Hydra and Centaurus.
Returning to the UK, Davies was based in Oxford leading the team that developed a proposal for UK participation in an 8-m telescope project which ultimately led to the establishment of the Gemini Observatory, twin 8m telescopes in Hawaii and Chile. He became Head of Astronomy at Durham University in 1994 where he developed his interest in integral field spectroscopy and played a leading role in building instruments for Gemini (GMOS) and the William Herschel Telescope (SAURON). He used these to map the motions and composition of the gas and stars in galaxies leading to new insights into galaxy evolution.

Davies returned to Oxford in 2002 as Philip Wetton Professor of Astrophysics (a post he holds in conjunction with a fellowship at Christ Church, Oxford) where he pursues research in cosmology and the evolution of galaxies. He was Head of the Physics Department from 2005-10 and Head of Astrophysics from 2011-14. From 2014 he has been Director of the Oxford Centre for Astrophysical Surveys.

As President of the Royal Astronomical Society between 2010 and 2012, Davies worked with the RAS community to make the continued case for astronomy and geophysics, an area in which the UK excels.

External links
 Personal CV
 Royal Astronomical Society Press release

References

Living people
1954 births
Alumni of University College London
Alumni of Churchill College, Cambridge
British astrophysicists
21st-century British astronomers
People from Scunthorpe
Royal Society Wolfson Research Merit Award holders
Statutory Professors of the University of Oxford
Fellows of Christ Church, Oxford
Presidents of the Royal Astronomical Society